Visa requirements for Mauritian citizens are administrative entry restrictions by the authorities of other states placed on citizens of Mauritius. As of 5 January 2021, Mauritian citizens had visa-free or visa on arrival access to 146 countries and territories, ranking the Mauritian passport 31st overall and 2nd in Africa in terms of travel freedom according to the Henley Passport Index. As of April 2019, Brunei, Grenada, Seychelles and Mauritius are the only countries whose citizens may travel without a visa to China, Russia, the Schengen Area and the United Kingdom.

Visa requirements map

Visa requirements

Dependent, Disputed, or Restricted territories
Unrecognized or partially recognized countries

Dependent and autonomous territories

See also

Visa policy of Mauritius
Mauritian passport
Foreign relations of Mauritius

References and Notes
References

Notes

Mauritius
Foreign relations of Mauritius